The  was the murder of 15-year-old Japanese high school student  by a 15-year-old female classmate on July 26, 2014. The murder took place in the suspect's apartment in Sasebo, Nagasaki Prefecture, where Matsuo was beaten with a metal tool, strangled to death, and then partially dismembered and decapitated.

Details
The suspect, who was 15 at the time of the crime, but turned 16 shortly after, allegedly posted details and photos of the crime to the popular Japanese message board 2channel, and told police that, "I wanted to kill someone. I bought tools by myself". The suspect had previously attacked her father with a metal baseball bat, prompting him and her step-mother (her biological mother died the previous year) to move her into her own apartment when she began attending high school. It is believed that she first attempted to "dissect" a cat and possessed several medical textbooks.

Aftermath
In response to the murder, Fuji TV cancelled the July 31, 2014, broadcast of the fourth episode of the re-edited Psycho-Pass anime, which would have also featured murder of teenage schoolgirls.

The girl's 54-year-old father apologized to Matsuo's family in July 2014 about his daughter's mental health. On October 5, 2014, he was found to have committed suicide by hanging.

In 2014, it was revealed that a psychiatrist who examined the girl had contacted a child consultation center in Nagasaki to reportedly warn officials that "If she is left as she is, she could kill someone." However, this warning was not acted upon, and in 2015, three officials of the Nagasaki Prefectural child consultation center were officially reprimanded by the prefectural government, which stated that the center had "failed to fulfill its duties".

See also
Sasebo slashing, a 2004 murder in Sasebo
Murder of Ryōta Uemura

References

Murder in Japan
2014 murders in Japan
July 2014 crimes in Asia
Murder committed by minors
Murdered Japanese children
People murdered in Japan
Sasebo
Incidents of violence against girls
Female murder victims